North Sydney is a suburb and major commercial district on the Lower North Shore of Sydney, Australia. North Sydney is located 3 kilometres north of the Sydney central business district and is the administrative centre for the local government area of North Sydney Council.

History

The Indigenous people on the southern side of Port Jackson (Sydney Harbour) called the north side warung which meant the other side, while those on the northern side used the same name to describe the southern side.

The first name used by European settlers was Hunterhill, named after a property owned by Thomas Muir of Huntershill (1765–1799), a Scottish political reformer. He purchased land in 1794 near the location where the north pylon of the Sydney Harbour Bridge is now located, and built a house which he named after his childhood home. This area north to Gore Hill became known as St Leonards. The township of St Leonards was laid out in 1836 in what is now North Sydney, bounded by what is now Miller, Walker, Lavender and Berry Streets. By 1846 there were 106 houses here and by 1859, the commercial centre had extended from Milsons Point to Miller Street. A bus service operated by Jeremiah Wall ran between Milsons Point and North Sydney Shops, and North Sydney thus developed its own identity.

The North Sydney municipality was incorporated in 1890 and after naming disputes, North Sydney was settled upon. The post office which opened in 1854 as St Leonards was changed to North Sydney in 1890. The first public school which opened in 1874 as St Leonards was renamed North Sydney in 1910.

North Sydney underwent a dramatic transformation into a commercial hub in 1971–72. In this period no less than 27 skyscrapers were built.

Trams

The history of the North Sydney tramway system can be divided into three periods – the first from the original opening in 1886 to 1909, when the McMahons Point line opened. The second period covers the time until the Wynyard line was opened across the Sydney Harbour Bridge in 1932, and the third until construction of the Cahill Expressway on the eastern side of Sydney Harbour Bridge and the wider closure of the system in 1962.

The first part of the North Sydney tramway system was a double-track cable tramway which commenced at the original Milsons Point Ferry wharf, located where the north pylon of the Harbour Bridge is now. The line originally extended via Alfred St (now Alfred Street South), Junction St (now Pacific Highway), Blue St and Miller Sts to the engine house and depot in Ridge St. It used cable grip cars called "dummies" and un-powered trailer cars.

A feature of these lines was the underground tram terminus at Wynyard railway station (the only one in Australia), and the tracks over the Sydney Harbour Bridge. Trams ran from Blue St, North Sydney over a now-demolished steel arch bridge over the Harbour Bridge Roadway, then over the eastern side of the harbour bridge (now road lanes), through a tram platform at Milsons Point railway station, before descending underground into platforms 1 and 2 of Wynyard station.

Heritage listings 

North Sydney has a number of heritage-listed sites, including those listed on the New South Wales State Heritage Register:
 36 Blue Street: Former North Sydney Technical High School (now Greenwood Hotel)
 20 Edward Street: Graythwaite
 Falcon Street: North Sydney Sewer Vent
 283a Miller Street: St Leonards Park
 6 Napier Street: Don Bank
 92-94 Pacific Highway: North Sydney Post Office
 44 Union Street: Kailoa

The following buildings are heritage-listed on other heritage registers:
 Chinese Christian Church, Alfred Street
 Christ Church, Walker and Lavender Streets
 Church of England Rectory, Lavender Street
 Houses: 11–37 Walker Street and 20–30 Walker Street
 Mercedes, 9 Walker Street
 St Francis Xavier's War Memorial Church, Mackenzie Street
 St Francis Xavier's Presbytery, Mackenzie Street
 St Francis Xavier's Church School Hall, Mackenzie Street
 St Peter's Presbyterian Church and Manse, Blues Point Road
 St Thomas's Church of England, West and Church Streets
 St Thomas's Kindergarten Hall, Church and McLaren Streets
 St Thomas's Church Rectory, McLaren Street
 Woodstock, Pacific Highway

Commercial area

The commercial district of North Sydney includes the second largest concentration of office buildings in New South Wales, with a large representation from the advertising and information technology industries. Advertising, marketing businesses and associated trades such as printing have traditionally dominated the business life of the area though these have been supplanted to a certain extent by information technology businesses. Corporations whose offices are in North Sydney include: Nine Entertainment Co, Cisco Systems, Vocus Communications, NBN Co, Novell, Sun Microsystems, AGL, Hyundai, AAMI, Sophos, Symantec, Nando's, Vodafone and NAB.

Unlike other major suburban hubs within the Sydney metropolitan area, North Sydney has limited shopping facilities and almost no Sunday trading. There are four supermarkets (Aldi, IGA, Coles and Woolworths Metro). The main shopping complex is the Greenwood Plaza, which is connected to North Sydney station. Berry Square is another shopping centre in Berry Street, formerly known as North Sydney Shopping World.

Population
The most common countries of birth were England 5.5%, India 4.3%, China 3.6%, New Zealand 3.2% and United States 1.9%. 63.6% of residents spoke only English at home. Other languages spoken at home included Mandarin 4.1%, Cantonese 2.9%, Hindi 2.0%, Spanish 1.7% and Japanese 1.7%. The most common responses for religion in North Sydney were No Religion 36.7% and Catholic 21.4%.

Transport
North Sydney is directly linked to the Sydney CBD by road and rail across the Sydney Harbour Bridge. North Sydney railway station is on the North Shore railway line of the Sydney Trains network. Bus services by Busways, Forest Coach Lines, Hillsbus and Keolis Downer Northern Beaches are heavily present in Blue Street, connecting train and bus services towards North Sydney's neighbouring suburbs as well as connecting train services to Richmond via City from the T1 North Shore & Northern Lines. The Warringah Freeway links North Sydney south to the Sydney CBD and north to Chatswood. High Street, North Sydney wharf is a wharf served by Neutral Bay ferry services, which is part of the Sydney Ferries network. It is possible to walk from parts of North Sydney to the city centre in less than 30 minutes, by way of the Sydney Harbour Bridge.

A new Victoria Cross metro station, located two blocks north of the existing North Sydney railway station, is planned to open in 2024 as part of the Sydney Metro City & Southwest project.

Places of worship

Churches include St Mary's Catholic Church on Miller Street, St Francis Xavier's War Memorial Church in Mackenzie Street, St Thomas Anglican Church on West and Church Streets, Christ Church on Walker and Lavender Streets, St Peter's Presbyterian Church and Manse on Blues Point Road and Chinese Christian Church on Alfred Street.

Hare Krishna Temple is located on the corner of Falcon Street and Miller Street.

Schools
Primary schools include North Sydney Demonstration School, Mosman Preparatory School and St Marys Primary School.

High schools include the public North Sydney Boys High School and North Sydney Girls High School, Cammeraygal High School, the Catholic Marist Catholic College North Shore and Monte Sant' Angelo Mercy College and independent schools Wenona School and Sydney Church of England Grammar School (Shore).

St Aloysius' College of Milson's Point and Loreto Kirribilli are also within the confines of the North Sydney local government area. Post-secondary education providers include the Australian Catholic University, APM College of Business and Communication, Raffles College of Design and Commerce, Walker and Miller Training and Billy Blue College of Design.

Landmarks

 North Sydney Post Office
 North Sydney Oval
 Stanton Library
Brett Whiteley Square
Museum at Mary MacKillop Place, which tells the story of Australia's first Catholic saint
 Don Bank Museum, devoted to the history of the local area
Greenwood Plaza shopping complex (built under the former public school, founded 1878 and renamed after its Principal)
 North Sydney railway station
 Victoria Cross railway station (under construction)
Independent Theatre
Walker Street Cinema (closed)

Sport and recreation
St Leonards Park which includes North Sydney Oval is the suburbs major recreation area, popular among joggers and those wishing to walk their dogs. North Sydney Ovals are notably cricket pitches during the summer and the home ground for the Northern Suburbs Rugby Union Club and the North Sydney Bears Rugby League Club during the winter.

The Norths Pirates Junior Rugby Union Club, is North Sydneys local junior village rugby union team who play all home games at Tunks Park in the adjoining suburb of Cammeray together with North Sydney Brothers, a junior rugby league club and the rugby league teams of Marist College North Shore.

 North Sydney Bears (rugby league team based in the area)
 North Sydney Cricket Club
 North Sydney Chess Club
  Norths Pirates Junior Rugby Union
 Northern Suburbs Rugby Club
 UTS Northern Suburbs Athletic Club
 Gordon-North Sydney Hockey Club
 North Sydney Symphony Orchestra

During the 2000 Summer Olympics, the city was the starting point of the marathon course that would end  later at the Olympic Stadium in Sydney.

Notable people
 Billy Blue, a convict after whom several places were named, such as Blues Point
 Arthur Bollard, Rugby league player 
 Theodora Cowan, Australia's first locally born sculptress, was living at 84 Berry Street when she died
 Paul Cuneo, Rugby league player 
 Sid Deane, Rugby league player 
 Antonella Gambotto-Burke, an author, born at the Mater Hospital, North Sydney
 Joe Hockey, politician, Treasurer of Australia
 Henry Lawson, a poet and short-story author
 Kel Nagle, a golfer who won the 1960 Open Championship
 Peter Taylor Test cricketer

Governance
The local government area of North Sydney Council includes the suburb of North Sydney and the surrounding suburbs of Crows Nest, Waverton, Neutral Bay, McMahons Point, Kirribilli, Cremorne (divided between North Sydney & Mosman) and Cammeray.

Gallery

References

External links

  [CC-By-SA]
 Monte Sant'Angelo Mercy College
 Wenona School
 Marist College North Shore
 North Sydney Boys High School
 North Sydney Girls High School
 Billy Blue College & Billy Blue Creative
 2001 Census Information

 
Venues of the 2000 Summer Olympics
Olympic athletics venues
Suburbs of Sydney
Central business districts in Australia